African blackwood dermatitis is a condition characterized by an allergic contact dermatitis associated with a musical instrument made of a particular type of wood.

See also 
 Contact dermatitis
 List of cutaneous conditions

References 

Contact dermatitis